The 1980 Penn Quakers football team represented the University of Pennsylvania in the 1980 NCAA Division I-A football season.

Schedule

Roster

References

Penn
Penn Quakers football seasons
Penn Quakers football